Caldecott is a surname. Notable people with the surname include:

 Andrew Caldecott, British colonial administrator
 Andy Caldecott, Australian racing driver
 Ben Caldecott, British environmentalist 
 John Caldecott (1800–1849), English astronomer
 Moyra Caldecott, British author
 Randolph Caldecott, British artist
 Thomas E. Caldecott, former mayor of Berkeley, California
 Thomas W. Caldecott, former California judge and politician
 Todd Caldecott, clinical herbalist and Ayurvedic practitioner
 William Shaw Caldecott (b. 1839), American author

See also
Caldicott (surname)

External links
 Caldicott One-Name Study